Thomas Lewis  was a Welsh international footballer. He was part of the Wales national football team, playing 2 matches. He played his first match on 26 February 1881 against England and his last match on 14 March 1881 against Scotland.

At club level, he played for Wrexham from 1880–1881.

See also
 List of Wales international footballers (alphabetical)

References

Welsh footballers
Wales international footballers
Wrexham A.F.C. players
Place of birth missing
Year of death missing
Year of birth missing
Association football midfielders